The Canton of Lignières is a former canton situated in the Cher département and in the Centre region of France. It was disbanded following the French canton reorganisation which came into effect in March 2015. It consisted of 9 communes, which joined the canton of Châteaumeillant in 2015. It had 4,097 inhabitants (2012).

Geography 
An area of forestry and farming in the valley of the river Arnon, in the western part of the arrondissement of Saint-Amand-Montrond centred on the town of Lignières. The altitude varies from 137m at Chezal-Benoît to 268m at Saint-Hilaire-en-Lignières, with an average altitude of 175m.

The canton comprised 9 communes:

La Celle-Condé
Chezal-Benoît
Ineuil
Lignières
Montlouis
Saint-Baudel
Saint-Hilaire-en-Lignières
Touchay
Villecelin

Population

See also 
 Arrondissements of the Cher department
 Cantons of the Cher department
 Communes of the Cher department

References

Lignieres
2015 disestablishments in France
States and territories disestablished in 2015